Rajesh Tope is an Indian politician and member of the Nationalist Congress Party. Rajesh Tope won the Ghansawangi (Vidhan Sabha constituency) in 2019 Maharashtra Legislative Assembly election. He won the 2009 Assembly Election from the same constituency. This is his third term as a member from Ghansawangi constituency, while before that he was 2 Time MLA from Ambad constituency, Maharashtra Legislative Assembly MLA. He served as the Health Minister of Maharashtra in the Uddhav Thackeray ministry. He also work as a guardian minister of Jalna in his political career.

Constituency
Rajesh Tope represents the Ghansawangi (Vidhan Sabha constituency) in Maharashtra Legislative Assembly.

Political party
Rajesh Tope is from the Nationalist Congress Party.

Positions held 
Maharashtra Legislative Assembly MLA
Terms in office: 2009-2014 & 2014-2019

References

Living people
Maharashtra MLAs 2014–2019
Marathi politicians
Nationalist Congress Party politicians from Maharashtra
1969 births
Maharashtra MLAs 2009–2014

mr:राजेश टोपे